The Château de Diant is a castle in the commune of Diant in the Seine-et-Marne département of France.

The castle was originally constructed in the 13th century for a companion of Philippe Auguste, with additions and modifications in the 15th century and the first half of the 19th.

The castle has been protected since 1946 as a monument historique by the French Ministry of Culture. The gardens are also listed. The castle and gardens are privately owned and not open to the public.

See also
List of castles in France

References

External links
Ministry of Culture:

Castles in Île-de-France
Seine-et-Marne
Monuments historiques of Île-de-France